Events in the year 2009 in Brazil.

Incumbents

Federal government
 President: Luiz Inácio Lula da Silva
 Vice President: José Alencar Gomes da Silva

Governors
 Acre: Binho Marques
 Alagoas: Teotônio Vilela Filho
 Amapa: Waldez Góes 
 Amazonas: Eduardo Braga 
 Bahia: Jaques Wagner
 Ceará: Cid Gomes
 Espírito Santo: Paulo Hartung
 Goiás: Alcides Rodrigues
 Maranhão: Jackson Lago (until 17 April), Roseana Sarney (starting 17 April)
 Mato Grosso: Blairo Maggi 
 Mato Grosso do Sul: André Puccinelli
 Minas Gerais: Aécio Neves 
 Pará: Ana Júlia Carepa
 Paraíba: Cássio Cunha Lima (until 18 February), José Maranhão (starting 18 February)
 Parana: Roberto Requião de Mello e Silva then Orlando Pessuti
 Pernambuco: Eduardo Campos
 Piauí: Wellington Dias 
 Rio de Janeiro: Sérgio Cabral Filho
 Rio Grande do Norte: Wilma Maria de Faria
 Rio Grande do Sul: Yeda Rorato Crusius
 Rondônia: Ivo Narciso Cassol 
 Roraima: José de Anchieta Júnior
 Santa Catarina: Luiz Henrique da Silveira 
 São Paulo: José Serra 
 Sergipe: Marcelo Déda
 Tocantins: Marcelo Miranda (until 9 September), Carlos Henrique Gaguim (starting 9 September)

Vice governors
 Acre:	Carlos César Correia de Messias
 Alagoas: José Wanderley Neto 
 Amapá: Pedro Paulo Dias de Carvalho 
 Amazonas: Omar José Abdel Aziz 
 Bahia: Edmundo Pereira Santos
 Ceará: Francisco José Pinheiro 
 Espírito Santo: Ricardo de Rezende Ferraço 
 Goiás: Ademir de Oliveira Meneses 
 Maranhão: Luís Carlos Porto (until 17 April), João Alberto Souza (starting 17 April)
 Mato Grosso: Silval da Cunha Barbosa 
 Mato Grosso do Sul: Murilo Zauith 
 Minas Gerais: Antonio Augusto Junho Anastasia 
 Pará: Odair Santos Corrêa 
 Paraíba: José Lacerda Neto (until 18 February), Luciano Cartaxo Pires de Sá (starting 18 February)
 Paraná: Orlando Pessuti 
 Pernambuco: João Soares Lyra Neto
 Piauí: Wilson Martins 
 Rio de Janeiro: Luiz Fernando Pezão
 Rio Grande do Norte: Iberê Ferreira 
 Rio Grande do Sul: Paulo Afonso Girardi Feijó 
 Rondônia: João Aparecido Cahulla
 Roraima: vacant
 Santa Catarina: Leonel Pavan 
 São Paulo: Alberto Goldman 
 Sergipe: Belivaldo Chagas Silva 
 Tocantins: 
 until 26 September: Eduardo Machado Silva
 26 September-8 October: vacant
 starting 8 October: Paulo Sidnei Antunes

Events 

 October 2 – The 121st IOC Session in Copenhagen, Denmark selects Rio de Janeiro as the host city for the 2016 Summer Olympics.
 November 11 – Brazil, along with Paraguay, suffers from a large power blackout at night, which affects several million people.

Deaths

References

External links 
 

 
2000s in Brazil
Years of the 21st century in Brazil
Brazil
Brazil